Idrissa "Saboteur" Malo Traoré (born 24 December 1943) is a Burkinabé football manager and former footballer, who managed the Burkina Faso national team.

Playing career
Traoré played as a right-back in Burkina Faso with Bobo Dioulasso and Jeanne d'Arc. He represented the Burkina Faso national team from 1964 to 1970.

Managerial career
Towards the end of his playing career, Traoré got his management badges and began his managerial career with Rail Club Kadiogo. He moved to the Ivory Coast with ASEC Mimosas in 1986, Djoliba AC 2000. He thereafter was appointed the manager of the Burkina Faso national team from 1992 to 1996, and had another stint with them in 2006.

References

External links
FDB Profile

Living people
1943 births
People from Sud-Ouest Region (Burkina Faso)
Burkinabé footballers
Burkina Faso international footballers
Burkinabé football managers
Burkina Faso national football team managers
Burkinabé Premier League players
Burkinabé expatriates in Ivory Coast
Association football fullbacks
21st-century Burkinabé people